The abbreviation S.A. or SA designates a type of limited company in certain countries, most of which have a Romance language as their official language and employ civil law. Originally, shareholders could be literally anonymous and collect dividends by surrendering coupons attached to their share certificates. Dividends were therefore paid to whomever held the certificate. Share certificates could be transferred privately, and therefore the management of the company would not necessarily know who owned its shares.

As with bearer bonds, anonymous unregistered share ownership and dividend collection enabled money laundering, tax evasion, and concealed business transactions in general, so governments passed laws to audit the practice. Nowadays, shareholders of S.A.s are not anonymous, though shares can still be held by a holding company in order to obscure the beneficiary.

In different countries
S.A. can be an abbreviation of:
  in Galician and European Portuguese (used in Portugal, Timor Leste, Macao, and Lusophone Africa)
  in Brazilian Portuguese (used in Brazil)
  in Asturian and Leonese
  in Catalan
  in Canadian French
 Mexico also has , which is analogous to the limited liability company.
  in Polish
  in Romanian

The Greek term  (A.E.) is usually translated into S.A. in English and foreign languages.

It is equivalent in literal meaning and function to:
  (N.V.) in Dutch
  (P.T. Tbk.) in Indonesia
  (Bhd.) in Malaysia
  (A.Ş.) or Anonim Ortaklık (A.O.) in Turkish
  (C.A.) in Ecuador and Venezuela

It is equivalent in function to:
  in Albanian
 ,  in Arabic
  (d.d.) in Croatian and Bosnian
 ,  (АД) in Bulgarian
 ,  (АД) in Macedonian
  (a.s.) in Czech
  (A/S) in Danish
  (Oy) in Finnish
  (AS) in Estonian
  (AG) in German
  (Rt) in Hungarian
  (Hf) in Icelandic
 Private Limited (Pvt. Ltd.) in India
 Public limited company (plc) in the United Kingdom, Ireland, and several Commonwealth countries
  in Laos
  (AB) in Lithuanian
  (AS) in Latvian
  (AS) in Norwegian
 ,  (AO) in Russian
 Private Limited (Pte. Ltd.) in Singapore
  (a.s.) in Slovak
  (d.d.) in Slovene
  (AB) in Swedish
 ,  (AT) in Ukrainian
 Publicly traded company or Incorporated (Inc.) in the United States, though the former term does not appear in the names of business entities
  (C.A.) in Andorra
  in Vietnam
  in Chinese

See also 
 Président-directeur général (France)

References

External links
 Global Witness on Anonymous Companies

Types of business entity
Types of companies of France